Reverend Turner Cottage is a heritage-listed clergy house at 360 George Street, Windsor, City of Hawkesbury, New South Wales, Australia. It is also known as Rev. Peter Turner Cottage and Oxalis Cottage. The property is owned by Hawkesbury City Council. It was added to the New South Wales State Heritage Register on 2 April 1999.

History 

The cottage was built for Wesleyan missionary Reverend Peter Turner. It was threatened with demolition in the 1970s, but was saved after community opposition. It was purchased by the former Municipality of Windsor in 1976 and restored in 1980.

It is now leased to an accounting practice by the Hawkesbury City Council.

Heritage listing 
Reverend Turner Cottage was listed on the New South Wales State Heritage Register on 2 April 1999.

References

Bibliography

Attribution 

New South Wales State Heritage Register
Windsor, New South Wales
Houses in New South Wales
Churches in New South Wales
Articles incorporating text from the New South Wales State Heritage Register